The Belgian Linguistic case (No. 2) (1968) 1 EHRR 252 is a formative case on the right to education under the European Convention of Human Rights, Protocol 1, art 2. It related to "certain aspects of the laws on the use of languages in education in Belgium",  was decided by the European Court of Human Rights in 1968.

Facts
The applicants submitted six applications (Applications No: 1474/62, 1677/62, 1691/62, 1769/63, 1994/63, 2126/64) between 1962 and 1964 on their own behalf and on the behalf of their  children, alleging that Belgian linguistic legislation, relating to education, infringed on their rights under the  European Convention, namely Article 8 (family life) in conjunction with Article 14 (non-discrimination), and Article 2 of the Protocol 1 (right to education) of March 1952. 
The Acts they brought litigation against basically stated the language of education shall be Dutch in the Dutch-speaking region, French in the French-speaking region and German in the German-speaking region.

Counsel submissions
The applicants, whose children totalled more than 800, asserted that the law of the Dutch-speaking regions where they lived did not include adequate provisions for French-language education. They also complained that the Belgian state withheld grants from institutions in these regions that did not comply with the linguistic provisions set out in the legislation for schools and refused to homologate certificates issued by these institutions.  Further, the state did not allow the applicants’ children to attend French classes in certain places,  forcing  applicants  to  enrol  their  children  in  local  schools,  contrary  to their aspirations, or send them further afield, which entailed risks and hardships.

The Government argued that the right to education in one's own language was not included in the Convention and the Protocol, and that the applicants did not belong to a national minority within the meaning of Article 14.

Judgment
The Court found by a majority of 8 to 7 that one of the Acts violated Art 14. But the Court also found unanimously that there had been no breach of Articles 8 and 14 of the Convention, and Article 2 of the protocol, with regard to the other contested legislation and points at issue. In reaching its decision the Court considered that the principle of equality of treatment enshrined in Article 14 was violated if the distinction had no objective and reasonable justification, did not pursue a legitimate aim, and was not proportionate to the aim pursued. Further to this, the Court opined that the right to education implied the right to be educated in the national language, and did not include the provision that the parent's linguistic preferences be respected.

The operative part of the Court's judgment read as follows.

See also
ECHR
Kjeldsen, Busk, Madsen and Pedersen v Denmark (1976) 1 EHRR 711
Campbell and Cosans v United Kingdom (1982) 4 EHRR 293
Ali (FC) v Headteacher and Governors of Lord Grey School [2006] UKHL 14

External links
 Final judgment
 1967 partial judgment on Belgium's preliminary objections

European Court of Human Rights cases decided by the Grand Chamber
Article 2 of Protocol No. 1 of the European Convention on Human Rights
Article 8 of the European Convention on Human Rights
Article 14 of the European Convention on Human Rights
Bilingualism in Belgium
Linguistic rights
Minority schools
European Court of Human Rights cases involving Belgium
1968 in case law
1968 in Belgium
1968 in education
Education in Belgium
Education case law